Pintura is an unincorporated community in northern Washington County, Utah, United States. Its peak population was 150, and the community was named Bellevue until 1925.

See also

References

External links

Unincorporated communities in Utah
Unincorporated communities in Washington County, Utah